The phrase Gauss–Markov is used in two different ways:
Gauss–Markov processes in probability theory
The Gauss–Markov theorem in mathematical statistics (in this theorem, one does not assume the probability distributions are Gaussian.)